

Princess consort of Liechtenstein

House of Liechtenstein

Notes

Liechtenstein princesses
 
History of Liechtenstein
Liechtenstein